Robert Lee Dickey (born November 26, 1953) is an American politician. He is a Republican representing District 140 in the Georgia House of Representatives.

Political career 

In 2011, Dickey won a special election to represent District 140 in the Georgia House of Representatives, and has been unopposed every election since then. He is running again in 2020.

As of July 2020, Dickey sits on the following committees:
 Agriculture & Consumer Affairs (Secretary)
 Appropriations: Education Subcommittee (Chairman)
 Banks & Banking
 Energy, Utilities & Telecommunications
 Higher Education
 Natural Resources & Environment
 Ways & Means

Personal life 

Dickey holds a Bachelor's degree in Business Administration from the University of Georgia and an MBA from Georgia College. He owns Dickey Farms, a peach and timber farm, and, in 2019, Dickey was named the Georgia Farmer of the Year. He and his wife, Cynde, have two children.

References 

Living people
People from Crawford County, Georgia
University of Georgia alumni
Georgia College & State University alumni
Republican Party members of the Georgia House of Representatives
21st-century American politicians
1953 births